ICICI Prudential Mutual Fund is an Indian asset management company founded in 1993 as a joint venture between ICICI Bank and Prudential plc.  It is the second-largest asset management company in India after the SBI Mutual Fund.

History

Origin
ICICI Prudential Mutual Fund's corporate headquarters are in the Bkc in Mumbai. It has grown from two locations and six employees in 1998 to over a thousand employees across 120 locations and more than 1.9 million investors in 2016.

Products and services
The AMC manages significant Assets under Management (AUM) in the Mutual Fund segment across asset classes. The AMC also caters to Portfolio Management Services and Real Estate Division for investors, spread across the country, along with International Advisory Mandates for clients across international markets.

Mutual Fund
The Mutual Fund primarily targets retail investors.

Portfolio Management Services
The Portfolio Management Services allows high net worth investors to invest in a more concentrated portfolio aiming at higher returns. In the year 2000, ICICI Prudential AMC was the first institutional participant to offer the service.

Real Estate Business
The Real Estate division targets high net worth investors and domestic institutional investors, with ICICI Prudential AMC starting the Real Estate Investment Series Portfolio in the year 2007.

Major Competitors
A few of the competitors for ICICI Prudential Mutual Fund in the mutual fund sector are HDFC Mutual Fund, Kotak Mutual Fund, Nippon India Mutual Fund, SBI Mutual Fund, Axis Mutual Fund, Birla Sun Life Mutual Fund, and UTI Mutual Fund.

See also 

 Mutual funds in India

References

External links
 

ICICI Bank
Mutual funds of India
Financial services companies based in Mumbai
Financial services companies established in 1993
1993 establishments in Maharashtra
Indian companies established in 1993